The Leyenda de Plata (2008) was professional wrestling tournament produced by the Mexican wrestling promotion Consejo Mundial de Lucha Libre (CMLLl; Spanish "World Wrestling Council") that ran from July 4, 2008, over the course of three of CMLL's Friday night shows in Arena México with the finals on July 25, 2008. The annual Leyenda de Plata tournament is held in honor of lucha libre legend El Santo and is one of CMLL's most important annual tournaments.

After being forced to withdraw from the 2007 tournament due to an injury Perro Aguayo Jr. won the first torneo cibernetico elimination match by outlasting Hajime Ohara, Stuka Jr., El Felino, Ephesto, Averno, La Máscara, Mephisto and Volador Jr. The following week Dr. Wagner Jr. also qualified for the semi-final by defeating Loco Max,  El Sagrado, Máscara Purpura, Virus, Sangre Azteca, El Hijo del Fantasma, La Sombra, Black Warrior and Heavy Metal. Perro Aguayo Jr. overcame Dr. Wagner Jr. with the help of Los Perros del Mal and the 2008 Leyenda de Plata saw the final that was originally planned for the 2007 tournament as Místico faced off against Perro Aguayo Jr. As in the semi-final Los Perros del Mal tried to interfere in the main event but was stopped by Místico's friends Héctor Garza and Dos Caras Jr., enabling Místico win Leyenda de Plata for the third time.

Production

Background
The Leyenda de Plata (Spanish for "the Silver Legend") is an annual lucha libre tournament scripted and promoted by the Mexican professional wrestling promotion Consejo Mundial de Lucha Libre (CMLL).  The first Leyenda de Plata was held in 1998 and was in honor of El Santo, nicknamed Enmáscarado de Plata (the Silver mask) from which the tournament got its name. The trophy given to the winner is a plaque with a metal replica of the mask that El Santo wore in both wrestling and lucha films.

The Leyenda de Plata was held annually until 2003, at which point El Santo's son, El Hijo del Santo left CMLL on bad terms. The tournament returned in 2004 and has been held on an almost annual basis since then. The original format of the tournament was the Torneo cibernetico elimination match to qualify for a semi-final. The winner of the semi-final would face the winner of the previous year's tournament in the final. Since 2005 CMLL has held two cibernetico matches and the winner of each then meet in the semi-final. In 2011, the tournament was modified to eliminate the final stage as the previous winner, Místico, did not work for CMLL at that point in time The 2008 edition of La Leyenda de Plata was the 10th overall tournament held by CMLL.

Storylines
The events featured a total of number of professional wrestling matches with different wrestlers involved in pre-existing scripted feuds, plots and storylines. Wrestlers were portrayed as either heels (referred to as rudos in Mexico, those that portray the "bad guys") or faces (técnicos in Mexico, the "good guy" characters) as they followed a series of tension-building events, which culminated in a wrestling match or series of matches.

Tournament overview

Cibernetico 1

Cibernetico 2

Results

July 4, 2008

July 11, 2008

July 18, 2008

July 25, 2008

References

2008 in professional wrestling
Leyenda de Plata
Events in Mexico City
July 2008 events in Mexico